The Minister of Defence of the Soviet Union refers to the head of the Ministry of Defence who was responsible for defence of the socialist Russian Soviet Federative Socialist Republic from 1917 to 1922 and the Soviet Union from 1922 to 1992.

People's Commissars for Military and Naval Affairs (1917–1934)

People's Commissar for the Armed Forces (1946)

Ministers of the Armed Forces (1946–1950)

Ministers of Defence (1953–1992)

See also
 College of War
 Ministry of War of the Russian Empire
 List of heads of the military of Imperial Russia
 Ministry of Defense (Soviet Union)
 Ministry of Defense Industry (Soviet Union)
 Ministry of Defence (Russia)
 General Staff of the Armed Forces of the Russian Federation
 Chief of the General Staff (Russia)

Notes

References

 
Defence of Soviet Union
Lists of government ministers of Russia